La Voix is the French Canadian version of The Voice. The first season of La Voix premiered on the TVA on 20 January 2013 and ended on 14 April 2013. It featured Marc Dupré, Jean-Pierre Ferland, Marie-Mai and Ariane Moffatt as the coaches. During the seasons mentors also took part. They were Daniel Bélanger, Claude Dubois, Annie Villeneuve and Fred St-Gelais. The series was produced by Stéphane Laporte and hosted by Charles Lafortune. The winner was Valérie Carpentier from Ariane Moffatt's Team.

Season Summary
 Winner
 Finalist

During the season, mentors also assisted various teams. They were:
Daniel Bélanger for Team Ariane Moffatt
Claude Dubois for Team Jean-Pierre Ferland
Annie Villeneuve for Team Marc Dupré
Fred St-Gelais for Team Marie-Mai.

Round 1: Blind auditions

Episode 1

Episode 2

Episode 3

Episode 4

Round 2: Battle rounds.
During the battle round, two candidates from the same team are paired by the team coach to battle it out in a duo performance of a song chosen by the coach, who decides which of the performing duo moves on to the next round.

 The contestant is saved
 The contestant is eliminated

Round 3: Chants de Bataille 
In this round, each coach chooses two contestants from the remaining seven in his team that should interpret solo a song chosen by the coach. At the end, the coach based on what he heard decides to keep one of them and send the other home, with him/her ending up with six contestants in his/her team.

 The contestant is safe
 The contestant is eliminated

Round 4: Live shows (Directs)

In this stage the contest is broadcast live with the public having a say in the fate of the contestants.

First finals (1/8)
The program spread on two weeks of 2 hours each, asks for each coach to nominate three of his contestants one week and three others the next, to sing songs of their own choice. Each day, one contestant is saved by the public vote and getting most votes, and one of the remaining two is saved by the coach with the third contestant being eliminated. At the end of this phase, each coach would end up with four of his six contestants for the following round.

 The contestant is saved by public vote
 The contestant is saved by the coach
 The contestant is eliminated

Quarter finals
Each group now containing four contestants each would be reduced to half, with one candidated from each group chosen by the public vote and one other saved by the coach.

 The contestant saved by public vote
 The contestant saved by the coach
 The contestant is eliminated

Semi-finals

In this round the two remaining contestants in each team would perform against each other to arrive at one finalist from each team. The coach would distribute his 100 points between his two contestants. To this would be added the percentages obtained through public vote to arrive at a general average to decide the finalist from the group.

 The contestant is saved and reaches the final
 The contestant is eliminated

Finale 
Performances
In the final, the contestants had to sing a song written and composed by their respective coaches

Audiences

References

La Voix
2013 Canadian television seasons